Laconia or Lakonia is a historical and administrative region of Greece located on the southeastern part of the Peloponnese peninsula. Its administrative capital is Sparta. The word laconic—to speak in a blunt, concise way—is derived from the name of this region, a reference to the ancient Spartans who were renowned for their verbal austerity and blunt, often pithy remarks.

Geography

Laconia is bordered by Messenia to the west and Arcadia to the north and is surrounded by the Myrtoan Sea to the east and by the Laconian Gulf and the Mediterranean Sea to the south. It encompasses Cape Malea and Cape Tainaron and a large part of the Mani Peninsula. The Mani Peninsula is in the west region of Laconia. The islands of Kythira and Antikythera lie to the south, but they administratively belong to the Attica regional unit of islands. The island, Elafonisos, situated between the Laconian mainland and Kythira, is part of Laconia.

The Eurotas is the longest river in the prefecture. The valley of the Eurotas is predominantly an agricultural region that contains many citrus groves, olive groves, and pasture lands. It is the location of the largest orange production in the Peloponnese and probably in all of Greece.  Lakonia, a brand of orange juice, is based in Amykles.

The main mountain ranges are the Taygetus  in the west and the Parnon  in the northeast. Taygetus, known as Pentadaktylos (five-fingers) throughout the Middle Ages, is west of Sparta and the Eurotas valley. It is the highest mountain in Laconia and the Peloponnese and is mostly covered with pine trees. Two roads join the Messenia and Laconia prefectures: one is a tortuous mountain pass through Taygetus and the other bypasses the mountain via the Mani district to the south.

The stalactite cave, Dirou, a major tourist attraction, is located south of Areopolis in the southwest of Laconia.

Climate
Laconia has a Mediterranean climate with warm winters and hot summers.  Snow is rare on the coast throughout the winter but is very common in the mountains.

History

Ancient history

Evidence of Neolithic settlement in southern Laconia has been found during excavations of the Alepotrypa cave site. Significant archaeological recovery exists at the Vaphio-tomb site in Laconia. Found there is advanced Bronze Age art as well as evidence of cultural associations with the contemporaneous Minoan culture on Crete. At the end of the Mycenean period, the population of Laconia sharply declined. In classical Greece, Laconia was Spartan territory but from the 4th century BC onwards Sparta lost control of various ports, towns and areas. From the mid-2nd century BC until 395 AD, Laconia was a part of the Roman Empire.

Medieval history

In the medieval period, Laconia formed part of the Byzantine Empire. In the 7th century, Slavic tribes settled in the Peloponnese. Two of them, the Melingoi and the Ezeritai, who settled in parts of Laconia, survived the subsequent Byzantine reconquest and re-Hellenization of the Peloponnese, and are attested until the late Middle Ages.

Following the Fourth Crusade, Laconia was gradually conquered by the Frankish Principality of Achaea. In the 1260s, however, the Byzantines recovered Mystras and other fortresses in the region and managed to evict the Franks from Laconia, which became the nucleus of a new Byzantine province. By the mid-14th century, this evolved into the Despotate of the Morea, held by the last Greek ruling dynasty, the Palaiologoi. The capital of the Despotate, Mystras, was a major site of the Palaiologan Renaissance, the last flowering of Byzantine culture. With the fall of the Despotate to the Ottomans in 1460, Laconia was conquered as well.

Modern history
With the exception of a 30-year interval of Venetian rule, Laconia remained under Ottoman control until the outbreak of the Greek War of Independence of 1821. Following independence, Sparta was selected as the capital of the modern prefecture, and its economy and agriculture expanded. With the incorporation of the British-ruled Ionian Islands into Greece in 1864, Elafonissos became part of the prefecture. After World War II and the Greek Civil War, its population began to somewhat decline, as people moved from the villages toward the larger cities of Greece and abroad.

In 1992, a devastating fire ruined the finest olive crops in the northern part of the prefecture, and affected the area of Sellasia along with Oinountas and its surrounding areas.  Firefighters, helicopters and planes battled for days to put out the horrific fire.

In early 2006, flooding ruined olive and citrus crops as well as properties and villages along the Eurotas river. In the summer 2006, a terrible fire devastated a part of the Mani Peninsula, ruining forests, crops, and numerous villages.

Municipalities

The regional unit, Laconia, is subdivided into five municipalities. These are (number as in the map in the infobox):
East Mani (Anatoliki Mani, 2)
Elafonisos (3)
Eurotas (4)
Monemvasia (5)
Sparta (1)

Prefecture

As a part of the 2011 Kallikratis government reform, regional unit Laconia was created out of the former prefecture Laconia. The prefecture had the same territory as the present regional unit. At the same time, the municipalities were reorganised, according to the table below.

Provinces
 Epidavros Limira Province – Molaoi
 Gytheio Province – Gytheio
 Lacedaemonia Province – Sparti
 Oitylo Province – Areopoli
Note: Provinces no longer hold any legal status in Greece.

Population
1907: 87,106
1991: 95,696
2001: 94,918
2011: 89,138

The main cities and towns of Laconia are (ranked by 2011 census population):
Sparta 17,408
Gytheio 4,717
Neapoli 3,130
Skala 3,089

Transport
Greek National Road 39, Tripoli – Sparti – Gytheio
Greek National Road 82, Pylos – Kalamata – Sparti
Greek National Road 86, Gytheio – Monemvasia
Molaoi to Leonidi Road, E, NE

Communications

Radio
FLY FM 89,7 (Sparta).
POLITIA 90,7 – ΠΟΛΙΤΕΙΑ 90.7 (Sparta)
Radio Sparti – 92.7 FM (Sparta)
Radiofonias Notias Lakonias (Southern Laconia Radio) – 93.5 (Gytheio)
Star FM – 94.7

Television
Ellada TV – UHF 43, Sparta
TV Notias Lakonias – Molaoi

Newspapers
Λακωνικός Τύπος
Ελεύθερη Άποψη
Νέα Σπάρτη
Παρατηρητής της Λακωνίας

See also
List of settlements in Laconia
List of traditional Greek place names
Laconic phrase

References

 
Prefectures of Greece
1833 establishments in Greece
Regional units of Peloponnese (region)